Winchcombeshire was an ancient county in the South West of England, in the Anglo-Saxon period, with Winchcombe as its county town. The county originated in the shiring of Mercia in the tenth or early eleventh centuries, perhaps by King Edward the Elder in the early 920s. It was merged into Gloucestershire in the early eleventh century, probably by King Cnut in 1017.

References

Further reading
Whybra, Julian, A Lost English County: Winchcombeshire in the Tenth and Eleventh Centuries. (Studies in Anglo-Saxon History, 1). Boydell & Brewer, Woodbridge, 1990.

See also
Hexhamshire
Allertonshire
Hallamshire
Howdenshire
Richmondshire

Anglo-Saxon settlements
History of Gloucestershire
Counties of England established in antiquity
Former counties of England
Winchcombe